Bankhaus Reuschel & Co. was founded in 1947. It has been part of the Dresdner Bank AG Group since 1970 and joined the Allianz Group in 2001.

In its business operations, Bankhaus Reuschel & Co. traditionally has focused on servicing middle market corporate customers and wealthy private clients.

The company has its head office in Munich, Germany and provides private customers with relevant advice on asset management issues. This includes asset management, financing schemes, real estate, insurance, investment research, and family office services.

External links
Bankhaus Reuschel & Co. Corporate website (German)
Bankhaus Reuschel & Co. About us (English)

Financial services companies based in Munich
Defunct banks of Germany
Banks established in 1947
Banks disestablished in 2010
German companies disestablished in 2010
German companies established in 1947